Shane Dobbin (born 22 January 1980) is a New Zealand inline skater and speed skater. Before competing on ice, he won a silver medal at The World Games 2001 in Akita and repeated this success at The World Games 2005 in Duisburg. He was New Zealand's only competitor in speed skating at the 2010 Winter Olympics, finishing 17th in the men's 5000 m. He was born in Palmerston North.

Dobbin was the first confirmed selection for the New Zealand team to the 2014 Winter Olympics. He was also named the New Zealand flagbearer at the 2014 Winter Olympics opening ceremony. He finished 14th in the men's 5000 speed skating.

References

External links
 
 

1980 births
New Zealand male speed skaters
Speed skaters at the 2010 Winter Olympics
Speed skaters at the 2014 Winter Olympics
Speed skaters at the 2018 Winter Olympics
Olympic speed skaters of New Zealand
Sportspeople from Palmerston North
Living people
World Single Distances Speed Skating Championships medalists
World Games silver medalists
Competitors at the 2001 World Games
Competitors at the 2005 World Games